Carlos Cedron (born 1 March 1933) is a Peruvian former sports shooter. He competed in the 50 metre rifle, three positions event at the 1960 Summer Olympics in Rome, Italy.

References

1933 births
Living people
Peruvian male sport shooters
Olympic shooters of Peru
Shooters at the 1960 Summer Olympics
People from Trujillo, Peru
20th-century Peruvian people